James Kenny may refer to:

 James C. Kenny (born 1953), American ambassador to Ireland (2003–2006)
 James Kenny (photographer), British photographer
 James Kenny (politician) (1898–1954), Australian politician
 James Kenny (VC) (c. 1824–1862), British soldier and recipient of the Victoria Cross
 James Kenny (archdeacon) (died 1822), Anglican priest
 Jim Kenny (1906–1967), Australian politician

See also 
James Kenney (disambiguation)
Kenny James (disambiguation)